The Reformed Presbyterian Church in Cuba was founded in 1890 by Evaristo Collazo. He participated in the war of Independence. The First Presbyterian Church in Havana was established in 1890 with a Cuban Presbyterian minister. But it had to close because the civil war. The communities became a presbytery of the Presbyterian Church (USA). In 1900 American Protestant missionaries arrived, among them many Presbyterians. They reinitiated the Presbyterian Church. During the following 60 years the church operated excellent schools. In 1959 it lost their educational institutions. In 1967 the church become autonomous. Since 1990 the church has experienced rapid growth. It has 3 presbyteries and 1 Synod. The church has 15,000 members and 60 congregations and several house fellowships. The church subscribes the Westminster Confession of Faith, Heidelberg Catechism, Second Helvetic Confession, Apostles Creed and the Barmen Declaration. It is a member of the World Communion of Reformed Churches.

Partner church relationship was established with the United Church of Canada since 1985.

References

External links
First Reformed Presbyterian Church in Havanna, Cuba

Protestantism in Cuba
Members of the World Communion of Reformed Churches
Presbyterian denominations in the Caribbean